Lasionycta pulverea is a moth of the family Noctuidae. It has a restricted range in the Rocky Mountain foothills of Alberta from Nordegg to Blairmore, with a single specimen from Lethbridge.

It is found in subalpine parkland and is nocturnal.

The wingspan is 29–34 mm for males and 32 mm for females. Adults are on wing in early and mid-July

External links
A Revision of Lasionycta Aurivillius (Lepidoptera, Noctuidae) for North America and notes on Eurasian species, with descriptions of 17 new species, 6 new subspecies, a new genus, and two new species of Tricholita Grote

Lasionycta
Moths described in 2009